Genobaud may refer to:

 Genobaud (3rd century), Frankish petty king
 Genobaud (4th century), Frankish leader